Freek Golinski (born 19 June 1991) is a Belgian male badminton player.

Achievements

BWF International Challenge/Series
Men's Doubles

 BWF International Challenge tournament
 BWF International Series tournament
 BWF Future Series tournament

References

External links
 

1991 births
Living people
Sportspeople from Leuven
Belgian male badminton players
European Games competitors for Belgium
Badminton players at the 2015 European Games